Something Beginning with C is an album by New Zealand band the Exponents, released in 1992. It reached number one and spent 19 weeks on the New Zealand Albums Chart and went three times platinum.

It was the first album to be credited as the Exponents, rather than their former name the Dance Exponents. It is the band's fourth studio album overall.

In May 2013, Universal Music re-released the album digitally in New Zealand in remastered standard and deluxe editions. The deluxe edition has thirteen additional tracks of B-sides and the original UK demo of "Why Does Love Do This To Me". The album title was a play on the original plan of the band's to have the initials of their albums spell 'peace'. Something Beginning with C followed the albums Prayers Be Answered, Expectations and Amplifier.

Track listing

Additional tracks on the 2013 digital deluxe edition:
"It Means I Mean You"
"Fuck" (Sheehan/Luck)
"Interesting Thing"
"What's Left Of Love"
"Are You Sure" (Gent/Luck)
"Close"
"Hey Girl Groove!"
"Only Virtually Mine"
"Sadness"
"Talking About That Girl"
"Why Does Love Do This To Me" (Demo)
"Harry's End Piece" (Luck/Gent/Jones/Harallambi)
"Cake Mix" (Gent/Jones/Harallambi)

Band members
Jordan Luck (vocals)
Brian Jones (guitar/vocals)
David Gent (bass guitar)
 Harry (drums)

Additional musicians
Ted Clarke
Frank Tiatto
Martin O'Neill
Malcolm Smith
Paul Moss

Credits
Produced by Duffy
Mixed by Duffy
Engineered by Duffy and Nigel Foster
Assistant engineer - Karen Opie
Produced by The Exponents and Porl Streekstra
Engineered by Porl Streekstra
Recorded at Airforce Studios, Auckland, New Zealand, Christmas 1991
Cover design: Chad Taylor
Photography: Darryl Ward, The Exponents

Charts

Weekly charts

Year-end charts

References

1992 albums
The Exponents albums
Mercury Records albums